Bruce Joseph Andrew Myers  (born December 16, 1972) has been the thirteenth Bishop of Quebec since 2017.

Born the fifth and youngest child of Charles Harry Myers (1932–2003) and Marion Beverly Coleman (1938–), Myers has four older siblings, Tracy Lee, Charles Edward, Lesley-Anne (Gold), and Gary.  Myers was educated at the University of Toronto. After a decade as a journalist with CJAD he was ordained in 2004. He served at Quebec City and Îles-de-la-Madeleine before his election as bishop.

References

 

Anglican bishops of Quebec
21st-century Anglican Church of Canada bishops
Living people
1972 births
University of Toronto alumni